First-seeded Roy Emerson defeated Arthur Ashe 6–4, 6–1, 6–4 in the final to win the men's singles tennis title at the 1967 Australian Championships. This was his sixth Australian men's singles crown which stood as an all time male record until it was surpassed in 2019 by Novak Djokovic.

Seeds
The seeded players are listed below. Roy Emerson is the champion; others show the round in which they were eliminated.

  Roy Emerson (champion)
  Arthur Ashe (finalist)
  John Newcombe (semifinals)
  Cliff Richey (quarterfinals)
  Tony Roche (semifinals)
  Mark Cox (quarterfinals)
  Owen Davidson (quarterfinals)
  Graham Stilwell (third round)
  Bill Bowrey (quarterfinals)
  Jim McManus (third round)
  Ray Ruffels (third round)
  Patrick Hombergen (second round)
  Barry Phillips-Moore (third round)
  Jim Osborne (third round)
  Will Coghlan (third round)
  Dave Power (second round)

Draw

Key
 Q = Qualifier
 WC = Wild card
 LL = Lucky loser
 r = Retired

Finals

Earlier rounds

Section 1

Section 2

Section 3

Section 4

External links
 1967 Australian Championships on ITFtennis.com, the source for this draw

1967
1967 in Australian tennis
Men's Singles